John Bush Jones (August 3, 1940 – December 31, 2019) was an American author, theatre director and critic, educator and scholar. He taught theatre for more than two decades at Brandeis University and wrote widely about musical theatre, publishing several books.

Early life and education
Jones was born in Chicago, Illinois in 1940. He described himself as a child of the World War II home front, having just turned five, eleven days before the Surrender of Japan. His experience influenced his writing career, and is reflected in his books.

He received an undergraduate degree in Speech (Theatre), with Distinction, from Northwestern University in 1962. He earned his Ph.D. from Northwestern in 1970. Jones married Sandra Pirie Carson, whose family commissioned architect Louis Sullivan to design the Carson Pirie Scott & Co. store in downtown Chicago. They were married for 10 years before divorcing and had one son, Aaron Carson.

Career
Jones reviewed drama for the Kansas City Star and taught English at the University of Kansas before joining the faculty at Brandeis University in 1978, in the Theater Arts Department. He received the 1995–1996 Louis Dembitz Brandeis Prize for Excellence in Teaching.

At Brandeis, Jones served on the organizing committee for many years of the Kennedy Center American College Theater Festival.  He directed numerous plays and musicals both at Brandeis and in professional theatre, including Ruddigore, Uncommon Women and Others and She Loves Me. He retired from Brandeis in 2001.

Bibliography 
Jones wrote several books and many articles. He wrote theatre criticism for several newspapers and magazines. His published books and a sampling of articles are listed below.

Books 
 W. S. Gilbert: A Century of Scholarship and Commentary, contributor, Bridget D'Oyly Carte, New York University Press, 1970. 
 Readings in Descriptive Bibliography, Kent State University, 1974. 
 Our Musicals, Ourselves: A Social History of the American Musical Theatre, Brandeis University Press, 2004. 
 The Songs That Fought the War: Popular Music and the Home Front, 1938-1945, Brandeis, 2006. 
 All-Out for Victory! Magazine Advertising and the World War II Home Front, Brandeis, 2009. 
Reinventing Dixie: Tin Pan Alley's Songs and Creation of the Mythic South, LSU Press, 2015.

Articles
 "Mr. Gilbert and Dr. Bowdler: A New Look at Gilbert's "Pateince", Victorian Poetry, Vol. 12 n1, (19740401): 65-66. 
 "The Printing of The Grand Duke: Notes Toward a Gilbert Bibliography," Papers of the Bibliographical Society of America, Vol. LXI., 1967.
 "Editing Victorian Playwrights: Some Problems, Priorities, and Principles," Theatre Survey, Vol. 17, Issue 1., May 1976.
 "British printers on galley proofs: a chronological reconsideration," In cooperation with the Bibliography Society, London: O.U.P.,1976.
" Victorian "Readers" and Modern Editors: Attitudes and Accidentals revisited," Papers of the Biographical Society of America, Vol. 71, number 1 (1977).
"From Melodrama to Tragedy: The Transformation of Sweeny Todd," New England Theatre Journal, Vol.2, isd. 1, 1991.

An archive of Jones' works is available at the Robert D. Farber University Archives and Special Collections Department, Brandeis University Libraries.

References

Sources

External links
Photo of Jones

American non-fiction writers
American male journalists
People from Chicago
2019 deaths
Northwestern University School of Communication alumni
1940 births
20th-century American journalists